Eugene Arhin is a Ghanaian politician. He is a member of the New Patriotic Party and the current Director of communications at the office of the President of Ghana, Nana Addo Dankwa Akufo-Addo.

Education 
Arhin is an alumnus of Presbyterian Boys' Secondary School, Legon, where he acquired his secondary school education. He furthered his education at the Kwame Nkrumah University of Science and Technology (KNUST) with a Bachelor of Science degree in Materials Engineering in 2006.

Career 
He worked as a teaching assistant for his mandatory one year national service at the Department of Materials Engineering. He also worked at the Danquah Institute, a think tank named after Dr. J. B. Danquah, as a research analyst.

Political life
In January 2017 he was appointed the Director of Communications at the Flagstaff House by President Nana Akufo-Addo. Prior to his appointment in 2017, He served as the press secretary to Nana Akufo-Addo for two years. In January 2021, after the re-election and investiture of Nana Akufo-Addo,he was reappointed by the President to continue to serve in that capacity.

References

New Patriotic Party politicians
Year of birth missing (living people)
Living people
Presbyterian Boys' Senior High School alumni
Kwame Nkrumah University of Science and Technology alumni